The Zanzibar Trade Union Congress (ZATUC) is a national trade union center in Tanzania. It was formed in 2002 from a merger of 9 unions in the Zanzibar region.

The ZATUC is affiliated with the International Trade Union Confederation.

References

Trade unions in Tanzania
International Trade Union Confederation
Trade unions established in 2002
2002 establishments in Tanzania
National federations of trade unions